The 1986 Pennsylvania gubernatorial election was held on November 4, 1986. Democrat Bob Casey narrowly defeated Republican Bill Scranton III, in a race that featured two very high-profile candidates. The race was a rematch of the lieutenant gubernatorial nominees in 1978, a race where Scranton defeated Casey. As of 2022, this is the most recent Pennsylvania gubernatorial race to have a margin within five points.

Republican primary
Lt. Governor Bill Scranton III ran unopposed for the Republican nomination.

Democratic primary

Candidates
Bob Casey, former Auditor General of Pennsylvania
Ed Rendell, District Attorney of Philadelphia

The affable Casey had a reformist but conservative track record that made him popular in rural areas and unionized towns, while Rendell had a strong urban base.

Results
After being defeated in the Democratic primary for governor on three prior occasions, Casey finally won his party's nod.

General election

Candidates
Bob Casey, former Auditor General (Democratic)
running mate: Mark Singel, State Senator from Johnstown
Heidi Hoover (Consumer)
running mate: John Brickhouse
Bill Scranton III, Lieutenant Governor (Republican)
running mate: Mike Fisher, State Senator from Upper St. Clair

Campaign
Casey, a moderate with strong labor ties and anti-abortion viewpoints, was often to the right of his Republican opponent on social issues; Scranton, whose father was a leading moderate, was pro-choice and attempted to connect with the fiscally conservative but socially progressive suburban voter.

The race featured back-and-forth polling in the months preceding the election, with the public demonstrating generally positive views toward both figures, but growing weary of their negative campaigning that dominated the contest. One of these many negative ads helped sway the election. Then-unknown political consultant James Carville commissioned commercials that emphasized Scranton's use of recreational drugs as a college student and his open practice of transcendental meditation; as a result, Casey appeared as the more socially conservative candidate, which helped him to garner a surprisingly high vote total in rural regions of the state.

Results

Notes

References

 

1986
Gubernatorial
Pennsylvania